Marcelo Danubio Zalayeta (born 5 December 1978) is a Uruguayan former footballer who played as a striker.

Zalayeta began his club career with Danubio before moving to Peñarol for a season in 1997, where he won the Uruguayan Primera División and the Uruguayan Liguilla Cup. Later that year, he was acquired by Italian club Juventus, where he remained for ten seasons, winning three Serie A titles and reaching the 2003 UEFA Champions League Final, although he was sent on several loan spells with Empoli, Spanish side Sevilla and Perugia during his time at the Turin club, due to heavy competition from other strikers in the team's line-up. He moved to Napoli  in 2007, where he remained for three more seasons, aside from a loan spell with Bologna during the 2009–10 season. After his time in Italy, he later spent a season with Turkish side Kayserispor, before returning to his home nation to play for Peñarol once again, winning the Uruguayan Primera División for a second time in 2013, before retiring in 2016.

At international level, Zalayeta represented the Uruguay national team on 32 occasions between 1997 and 2005, scoring ten goals. At youth level, he was a member of the team that finished second in the 1997 FIFA World Youth Championship, and at senior level, he helped Uruguay reach the 1999 Copa América Final.

Club career
Zalayeta started his career with Danubio and then moving to Peñarol in Uruguay in 1997, where he made a name for himself, winning the Uruguayan Primera División and the Uruguayan Liguilla Cup. He moved to Juventus later that year, but although he was considered a promising young player at the time, he was not given much of a chance to prove himself due to heavy competition from several other prominent forwards at the club. However, he scored a decisive goal on his Serie A debut on 14 March 1998, in a 2–2 home draw against Napoli; Juventus would finish the season as league champions. He then spent a season on loan with Empoli, and he also starred in Uruguay's surge for the Copa América in 1999, who lost in the final to Brazil. Two more years away from the club followed, and he played for Spanish side Sevilla until 2001. At last, when it seemed Juve lacked forwards, he was brought back to Italy at the start of the 2001–02 season, but he was loaned out to Perugia in 2004 before returning to Juventus in the same year.

Although he did not play many matches with Juventus, he performed well when given a chance, winning three Serie A titles (1998, 2002, 2003), two Supercoppa Italiana medals (2002 and 2003), and a Serie B title in 2007, also helping the club to the 2002 Coppa Italia Final. During his time at the club, he was given the nickname "Panteron". He scored two very important extra time winners against Spanish opposition upon his return to Juventus. One came in 2003 in the quarter-finals of UEFA Champions League against Barcelona, the other against Real Madrid in the 2005 round of 16. In the 2003 UEFA Champions League Final, Zalayeta was one of the three Juventus players to have their penalty saved by Milan keeper Dida in the shootout after a 0–0 draw, as Milan won the title.

After a decade with Juventus, he moved to Napoli in the summer of 2007. Napoli paid €1.4 million for half of the rights (co-ownership). He played 49 Serie A matches and scored 12 goals in 2 seasons, but at the start of 2009–10 season he became surplus to the team and was not offered a shirt number. On 21 August 2009, he joined Bologna on loan for the 2009–10 season.

On 1 July 2010, Zalayeta returned to Napoli but failed to enter first team. He left for Turkish side Kayserispor on a two-year contract on 25 August.

Zalayeta joined his former Uruguayan side Peñarol as a free agent on 17 July 2011; he won the Uruguayan Primera División for a second time in 2013 before retiring in 2016.

International career
Zalayeta was called up for the 1997 FIFA World Youth Championship in Malaysia with the Uruguay national under-20 team, scoring four goals throughout the tournament as his team reached the final, and was defeated by Argentina.

With the senior Uruguay national team, he took part at the 1997 FIFA Confederations Cup, in which Uruguay managed a fourth-place finish, and the 1999 Copa América, scoring three goals in five appearances in the latter tournament, as they reached the final of the competition, only to be defeated by Brazil.

Zalayeta represented Uruguay during his country's campaign to qualify for the 2006 FIFA World Cup, notably scoring a hat-trick in a 3–2 home win over Colombia on 4 September 2005. He was selected in a 23-man squad for Uruguay's World Cup intercontinental playoff against Australia on 16 November. Zalayeta was one of two penalty kick takers whose shots were saved by Australian goalkeeper Mark Schwarzer. Zalayeta's failure to convert culminated in Australia winning the play-off 4–2 on penalties, qualifying for the 2006 FIFA World Cup finals in Germany, and eliminating Uruguay in the process. This was his final appearance for Uruguay. In total, he made 32 appearances for the national team between 1997 and 2005, scoring ten goals.

Style of play
A tall and physically strong forward, with a slender build, Zalayeta usually played as a centre-forward, and was primarily known for his technical skills and touch on the ball, as well as his eye for goal, heading, and ability in the air, which enabled him both to score and assist goals with his head; however, despite being a quick player in his youth, he was also known for his lack of pace as his career progressed. A team player, he was also known for his work-rate, ability to link-up with teammates, and hold up the ball with his back to goal, and was often involved in the build-up of attacking plays; he also possessed good movement, which enabled him to find spaces and get on the end of his teammates passes. Regarded as a promising but undisciplined player in his youth, he later developed into a more mature and reserved player as his career progressed, and was known for his tendency to score decisive goals for his teams, especially after coming off the bench, in particular during his time with Juventus, despite his lack of playing time with the club. He also had a strong personality, and was known for his exuberant goal celebrations with his arms lowered. He was nicknamed il panterone ("the big panther," in Italian) in the media throughout his career, due to his movements and agility.

Personal life
In December 1999, Zalayeta and compatriot Sevilla teammates Nicolás Olivera and Marcelo Otero were charged for assaulting a man. Having struck a plea bargain, they paid €3,600 fines in March 2002 instead of facing a maximum eight-year sentence.

Honours

Club
Juventus
 Serie A: 1997–98, 2001–02, 2002–03
 Serie B: 2006–07
 Supercoppa Italiana: 2002, 2003

Peñarol
 Uruguayan First Division Championship: 1997, 2012–13
 Uruguayan Liguilla Cup: 1997

International
Uruguay
 FIFA World Youth Championship: 1997 (2nd place)
 Copa América: 1999 (2nd place)

References

External links

 
 
 

Afro-Uruguayan
Uruguayan footballers
Uruguayan expatriate footballers
Uruguayan expatriate sportspeople in Italy
Uruguayan expatriate sportspeople in Spain
Uruguayan expatriate sportspeople in Turkey
Expatriate footballers in Italy
Expatriate footballers in Spain
Expatriate footballers in Turkey
Uruguay under-20 international footballers
Uruguay international footballers
1997 FIFA Confederations Cup players
1999 Copa América players
Danubio F.C. players
Peñarol players
Empoli F.C. players
Juventus F.C. players
A.C. Perugia Calcio players
S.S.C. Napoli players
Bologna F.C. 1909 players
Kayserispor footballers
Association football forwards
Uruguayan Primera División players
Serie A players
Serie B players
La Liga players
Süper Lig players
1978 births
Living people
Sevilla FC players